Qara Deh may refer to:
 Qara Deh, Hamadan
 Qara Deh, Lorestan